Soufiane Dadda (born 18 June 1990) is a Dutch-Moroccan footballer who plays for amateur side Vitesse '08.

Club career
He made his professional debut for VVV-Venlo in August 2008 against Go Ahead Eagles in the Eerste Divisie. He also played for Fortuna Sittard, whom he joined on loan from VVV in 2010, and FC Eindhoven.

He joined amateur side De Treffers in January 2015, and later played for Vitesse '08 and Rood Wit Groesbeek. In 2017, Dadda joined VV Alverna and in 2019 moved to VV Germania in Groesbeek. He returned to Vitesse '08 in mid-2020.

References

External links
 

1990 births
Living people
Footballers from Venlo
Dutch sportspeople of Moroccan descent
Association football wingers
Dutch footballers
VVV-Venlo players
Fortuna Sittard players
FC Eindhoven players
De Treffers players
Eredivisie players
Eerste Divisie players
Derde Divisie players
Eerste Klasse players